The 1986–87 St. Louis Blues season was the 20th in franchise history.  It involved the team finishing with a 32–33–15 record, good for 79 points, as they finished 1st in the Norris Division, clinching the title on the final day of the regular-season.  This would be the final division title for the Blues until the 1999–2000 season.

Offseason

Regular season

Final standings

Schedule and results

Playoffs
The Blues lost the Norris Division semifinal series to the Toronto Maple Leafs in six games.

Player statistics

Regular season
Scoring

Goaltending

Playoffs
Scoring

Goaltending

Awards and records

Transactions

Draft picks
St. Louis's draft picks at the 1986 NHL Entry Draft held at the Montreal Forum in Montreal, Quebec.

Farm teams

See also
1986–87 NHL season

References

External links

St.
St.
St. Louis Blues seasons
Norris Division champion seasons
St Louis
St Louis